The Canistota School District is a public school district in McCook County, based in Canistota, South Dakota.

Schools
The Canistota School District has one elementary school that serves grades kindergarten through sixth grade, and one high school that serves seventh grade through twelfth grade.

Elementary school 
Canistota Elementary School

High school
Canistota High School

References

External links

School districts in South Dakota